Pedro E. Pico (27 July 1882 – 12 November 1945) was an Argentine dramatist, lawyer, journalist and screenwriter. His plays such as La polca del espiante and ¡Para eso se paga! were performed at the Teatro de la Comedia, and he later wrote several plays with Samuel Eichelbaum including Un romance turco (A Turkish Romance)  (1920) and La Juana Figueroa (1921). In the 1940s he became a successful screenwriter; at the 1944 Argentine Film Critics Association Awards he won the Silver Condor Award for Best Adapted Screenplay with Manuel Agromayor and Alfredo de la Guardia for Juvenilia.

Plays and screen credits 

Theatre works 
 Querer y cerrar los ojos
 Pueblerina
 Trigo guacho
 San Juancito de Realicó
 La novia de los forasteros
 La historia se repite
 Novelera
 Agua en las manos
 Las rayas de una cruz'

Screenwriter

 Con las alas rotas (1938)
 La luz de un fósforo (1940) 
 Último refugio (1941)
 Cándida millonaria (1941) 
 Story of a Poor Young Man (1942)
 La novia de los forasteros (1942)
 Stella (1943) 
 Juvenilia (1943) 
 Los hombres las prefieren viudas (1943) 
 El Capitán Pérez (1946)
 El diablo andaba en los choclos'' (1946)

References

External links
 

Argentine dramatists and playwrights
Argentine journalists
Male journalists
Male screenwriters
20th-century Argentine lawyers
Silver Condor Award for Best Adapted Screenplay winners
1882 births
1945 deaths
Male dramatists and playwrights
20th-century dramatists and playwrights
20th-century Argentine male writers
20th-century Argentine screenwriters
20th-century journalists